The 2004 Budweiser Shootout was the first exhibition stock car race of the 2004 NASCAR Nextel Cup Series season and the 26th iteration of the event. The race was held on Saturday, February 7, 2004, before a crowd of 75,000 in Daytona Beach, Florida, at Daytona International Speedway, a 2.5-mile (4.0-km) permanent triangular-shaped superspeedway. The race took the scheduled 70 laps to complete. Robert Yates Racing driver Dale Jarrett would make a last lap pass and defend against Dale Earnhardt, Inc. driver Dale Earnhardt Jr. to win his third Budweiser Shootout. To fill out the podium, Kevin Harvick of Richard Childress Racing would finish third.

Background 

Daytona International Speedway is one of three superspeedways to hold NASCAR races, the other two being Indianapolis Motor Speedway and Talladega Superspeedway. The standard track at Daytona International Speedway is a four-turn superspeedway that is 2.5 miles (4.0 km) long. The track's turns are banked at 31 degrees, while the front stretch, the location of the finish line, is banked at 18 degrees.

Format and eligibility 
The race was broken up into two segments: a 20-lap segment, followed by a ten-minute intermission, concluding with a 50-lap second segment. While a pit stop was no longer required by rule, a reduction in fuel cell size (from 22 gallons to 13.5 gallons) made a fuel stop necessary. (In 2007, fuel cells were expanded to 18.5 gallons.) Many drivers also changed two tires during their fuel stop, as the time required to fuel the car allowed for a two-tire change without additional delay.

Pole winners of the previous season were automatically eligible for the race. Then, previous winners who had not already qualified would receive automatic births.

Entry list 

*Withdrew due to the team's owner, Richard Petty, holding a 50-year promise to his mother that his race team would not be affiliated with alcohol in any way.

Practice

First practice 
The first practice session was held on Friday, February 6, at 3:45 PM EST, and would last for one hour and 15 minutes.

Second and final practice 
The second and final practice session, sometimes referred to as Happy Hour, was held on Friday, February 6, at 6:30 PM EST, and would last for one hour.

Starting lineup 
The starting lineup was determined by a blind draw. Jeremy Mayfield of Evernham Motorsports would win the pole.

Full starting lineup

Race results

References 

2004 NASCAR Nextel Cup Series
NASCAR races at Daytona International Speedway
February 2004 sports events in the United States
2004 in sports in Florida